Nigerian Army University Biu (NAUB) is a Nigerian Public tertiary institution located in Biu, Borno State, Nigeria. It is a research higher institution for innovation and technology for the Nigerian Army. It was established in 2018.

The university is managed by the Nigerian Army which has 75% civilian and 25% military and paramilitary. It is the first Nigerian Army University and Africa's First Green University.

Background 
Nigerian Army University Biu was established by the federal government of Nigeria to be a centre of innovation and technological development for the Nigerian defence sector and the nation to meet the ever-changing and rapid development in the dynamics of modern warfare. The Act to establish it was passed in 2018.

The university is located in Biu, Borno State. It focuses on research and technological innovation in the defence sector with particular emphasis on local challenges in asymmetrical warfare in Nigeria, Africa and the world at large.

Vice Chancellors 

 On 28 May 2019, the Nigerian Chief of Army Staff (COAS), Lt-Gen. Tukur Yusuf Buratai approved the appointment of Prof. David Iliya Malgwi as vice chancellor of Nigerian Army University Biu (NAUB)
 On 23 March 2020, the appointment of Prof. Kyari Mohammed was approved as Vice Chancellor of Nigerian Army University

Courses offered
 Mechanical engineering
 Civil Engineering
 Building
 English Language
 Mathematics
 Physics
 Biology
 International Relations
 Information Sciences
 Information Technology
 Computer Science
 Cyber Security
 Economics
 Political Science
 Electrical Electronic
 Military History

Student Accommodation

The Nigerian Army University Biu Hostel is located right inside the Nigerian Army Barracks Biu, providing adequate security for students of the institution.

References 

Nigerian Army
Military education and training in Nigeria
Universities and colleges in Nigeria
Educational institutions established in 2018
2018 establishments in Nigeria